Todd Woodcroft (born August 15, 1972) is a Canadian ice hockey coach. He is the current head coach of the University of Vermont men's ice hockey team.

Coaching career
Woodcroft began coaching by running his own hockey school until joining the Minnesota Wild as a video coach in 2000. During his work with the Wild, Woodcroft also served as a video coach for Team Canada at the 2004 IIHF World Championship, helping the team win a gold medal. From 2006 to 2009, he'd serve in scouting role with the Washington Capitals and Wild respectively, while also serving as an assistant coach for Belarus during the 2006 IIHF World Championship. Woodcroft also served as the assistant general manager and director of player personnel for one season at HC Dinamo Minsk.

From 2009 to 2013, Woodcroft was a scout for the Los Angeles Kings, and was part of the team's 2012 Stanley Cup-winning squad. He joined the Calgary Flames as the director of scouting, while simultaneously coaching for both Belarus and Switzerland during international competition. In 2016, he joined the Winnipeg Jets as an assistant coach under Paul Maurice. Woodcroft would also be on staff for Sweden's 2017 IIHF World Championship Gold medal performance, and during the 2016 World Cup of Hockey.

On April 15, 2020, Woodcroft was named the fifth head coach in University of Vermont history, replacing Kevin Sneddon.

Personal life
Woodcroft comes from a hockey family. His older brother Craig is the head coach at Dinamo Minsk, while younger brother Jay is currently the head coach of the NHL's Edmonton Oilers. Two of his uncles were part of the "Flying Fathers," a traveling hockey team of ordained Catholic priests.

Head coaching record

References

External links

Todd Woodcroft at EliteProspects

1972 births
Living people
Canadian ice hockey coaches
Ice hockey people from Ontario
McGill University alumni
University of Toronto alumni
Winnipeg Jets coaches
Minnesota Wild scouts
Washington Capitals scouts
Los Angeles Kings scouts
Calgary Flames scouts
Vermont Catamounts men's ice hockey coaches